Sydenham Institute of Management Studies, Research and Entrepreneurship Education (SIMSREE) is one of the top management institutes in India under the aegis of the University of Mumbai. It was named after the then-governor of Bombay, Lord Sydenham of Combe in 1913. He was an early propoent in the spread of commerce-based vocational courses in India. Thus, Sydenham College became the oldest degree awarding institution in commerce. SIMSREE was established in 1983. K.S.Aiyar acted as first honorary principal of college. It was only in 1941, twenty-eight years after the establishment of Sydenham college, that any other institutions started offering courses in the subject.

Brief history
SIMSREE's parent institute, Sydenham College of Commerce and Economics is one of the most renowned commerce colleges in India. Established in October 1913, Sydenham College, commenced its journey as the first college of commerce in Asia. It was named after the then-governor of Bombay, Lord Sydenham of Combe, who was an early proponent in the spread of commerce-based vocational courses in India. Thus, Sydenham College became the oldest degree-awarding institution in commerce. SIMSREE was established in 1983. K. S. Aiyar acted as first honorary principal of the college. It was only in 1941, twenty-eight years after the establishment of Sydenham College, that any other institutes started offering courses in the subject.

Programmes
Full Time Courses
 Masters in Management Studies (MMS)
Masters in Management Studies is the flagship course of SIMSREE. It is a two-year full-time post-graduate degree course in management. Started as early as 1983, the institute offers specializations in the second year of the MMS course. The title of the programme as MMS, instead of the usual MBA, is to emphasise that the principles and practices of management studies are applicable to all types of organisation and not only to business organisations.

Students can specialize in:

 Finance
 Marketing
 Personnel (HR)
 Operations
 Systems

Part Time Courses
 Master's in Financial Management (MFM) - 3 years 
 Master's in Marketing Management (MMM) - 3 years

Doctor of Philosophy (PhD)

The specialisation of PhD can be done in management related subjects like Marketing, Finance, Human Resource and Operations.

Notable alumni
Ashish Bhasin - Chairman & CEO, South Asia Dentsu Aegis Network & Chairman, Posterscope & Pslive – Asia Pacific 
Neeraj Roy - CEO & MD, Hungama.com 
Nischal Khorana - Senior Director, ICT Practice, Asia Pacific - Frost & Sullivan Asia-Pacific
Sanjay Behl - CEO and Executive Director [[[Greaves Electric Mobility]]]
Ashish Hemrajani - Founder and CEO, Bigtree Entertainment (Bookmyshow.com)
Shyam Sutaria - CEO International Business Emami Ltd.
Govan Dhananjayan - CEO South Film Business- UTV Motion Pictures
Sanjay Chandel- CEO & MD, Indiabulls Mutual Fund
Ashwin Yerdi - COO, Capegemini Ltd.
Sameer Anjaria - COO, Bharti Airtel
Sanjay Apte - MD, Mortgage Banking, JP Morgan Chase
Munawwar Shah - AVP, Deutsche BankPrashanth Rathi - Senior Vice President, Bank of America, Merrill Lynch & Co.Parimal Shah - Vice President and Market DirectorAxis BankAbhay Lonkar- Director- Marketing & Sales, Abbott HealthCare SolutionsAshwini Kapila - Director, Barclays Ltd.Dharmesh Sodah - Director, World Gold Council, India''

Awards and honours
 Bloomberg UTV B-School Excellence Awards: Outstanding B-School (West)
 Indy Awards: Indy’s B-School Leadership Award
 World Corporate Universities Congress Awards - Outstanding contribution to Education
 DNA Award: Best Innovative B-School award
 Dainik Bhaskar National Education Leadership Awards - Outstanding B-School(West Zone) & Industry Related Curriculum in Marketing
 ABP News Awards: Outstanding B-School in Industry Related Curriculum in Marketing, Outstanding B-School(West Zone)
 Lokmat National Education Leadership Awards - Outstanding B-School(West Zone)
 Dewang Mehta Business School Awards - Best Business School that encourages Leadership

Rankings
 Ranked 10th in terms of recruiter satisfaction - Outlook
 Ranked 2nd in terms of Industry Interaction - Outlook
 5th best B-School in India for Placements - Business World- Ipsos survey of India's Best B-Schools 2013
 8th in Placement Process - Business Today
 12th in terms of Salary Statistics - CNBC TV18
 2nd best B-School in ROI - Outlook
 4th best public B-School in West Zone - MBA Universe
 Ranked 16th at All India level - Careers 360
 Ranked 19th at All India level - The Week

References

Business schools in Mumbai
Affiliates of the University of Mumbai
Educational institutions established in 1983
1983 establishments in Maharashtra